The 1999 Cornell Big Red football team was an American football team that represented Cornell University during the 1999 NCAA Division I-AA football season. Cornell finished third in the Ivy League. 

In its second season under head coach Pete Mangurian, the team compiled a 7–3 record and outscored opponents 254 to 235. Nate Fischer and Deon Harris were the team captains. 

The Big Red's 5–2 conference record placed third in the Ivy League standings. Cornell outscored Ivy opponents, 165 to 152. 

Cornell played its home games at Schoellkopf Field in Ithaca, New York.

Schedule

References

Cornell
Cornell Big Red football seasons
Cornell Big Red football